Paraíso perdido (English Lost Paradise) is a 2016 Mexican thriller film directed by Humberto Hinojosa Ozcariz and starring Ana Claudia Talancón, Iván Sánchez, Andrés Almeida and Raúl Briones.

Plot  
Sofia, Mateo and Pedro are close friends that decide on a getaway to the exotic and beautiful islands of the Mexican Caribbean. They are unaware that the holiday may be their last.

Cast  
 Ana Claudia Talancón as Sofia
 Iván Sánchez as Mateo
 Andrés Almeida as Pedro
 Raúl Briones as El niño

Crew
The movie was filmed in the island of Cozumel in Quintana Roo, Mexico

References

External links
 
 http://extremotuxtla.com/actualidad/el-trailer-oficial-de-paraiso-perdido-la-nueva-pelicula-de-ana-claudia-talancon
 http://www.ntrguadalajara.com/post.php?id_nota=32946
 http://zetatijuana.com/2016/03/11/paraiso-perdido-llega-a-carteleras/
 http://www.elsiglodedurango.com.mx/noticia/649324.andres-almeida-llega-a-un-paraiso-perdido.html
 148584-llegan-talancon-e-ivan-sanchez-a-los-cines-con-paraiso-perdido
 http://sipse.com/novedades/pelicula-terror-hecha-cozumel-llega-a-pantallas-de-cine-paraiso-perdido-ana-claudia-talancon-195389.html
 http://netnoticias.mx/2016-03-10-b6d14cf2/paraiso-perdido-thriller-psicologico-basado-en-hechos-reales/
 http://www.cinepremiere.com.mx/57999-paraiso-perdido.html

2016 films
Mexican thriller films
2010s Mexican films